In enzymology, a 4-(hydroxymethyl)benzenesulfonate dehydrogenase is an enzyme that catalyzes the chemical reaction

4-(hydroxymethyl)benzenesulfonate + NAD+  4-formylbenzenesulfonate + NADH + H+

Thus, the two substrates of this enzyme are 4-(hydroxymethyl)benzenesulfonate and NAD+, whereas its 3 products are 4-formylbenzenesulfonate, NADH, and H+.

This enzyme belongs to the family of oxidoreductases, specifically those acting on the CH-OH group of donor with NAD+ or NADP+ as acceptor. The systematic name of this enzyme class is 4-(hydroxymethyl)benzenesulfonate:NAD+ oxidoreductase. This enzyme participates in 2,4-dichlorobenzoate degradation.

References 

 

EC 1.1.1
NADH-dependent enzymes
Enzymes of unknown structure